Ararat Harutyunyan (born 24 August 1975) is an Armenian retired footballer. He last worked as the sporting director of Armenian Premier League club Shirak. While working for Shirak, Harutyunyan was banned for life from professional football, following a match fixing scandal in May 2018.

National team statistics

References

External links
 

Living people
1975 births
Footballers from Gyumri
Armenian footballers
Armenia international footballers
FC Shirak players
Ulisses FC players
Armenian Premier League players
Association football defenders